The 1991–92 Oklahoma State Cowboys basketball team represented Oklahoma State University as a member of the Big Eight Conference during the 1991–92 NCAA Division I men's basketball season. The team was led by second-year head coach Eddie Sutton and played their home games at Gallagher-Iba Arena. The Cowboys won their first 20 games and rose to the No. 2 ranking in both major polls. They finished with a record of 28–8 (8–6 Big Eight) and tied for second in Big Eight regular season play.

Oklahoma State received an at-large bid to the NCAA tournament as No. 2 seed in the Southeast region. After defeating Georgia Southern in the opening round, the Cowboys defeated Tulane to reach the Sweet Sixteen. The run ended in the Southeast regional semifinal, as Michigan defeated OSU 75–72.

Roster

Source:

Schedule and results

|-
!colspan=9 style=| Regular season

|-
!colspan=9 style=| Big Eight Tournament

|-
!colspan=9 style=| NCAA tournament

Rankings

Awards and honors
Byron Houston – Consensus Second-Team All-American

NBA draft

References

Oklahoma State Cowboys basketball seasons
Oklahoma State
1991 in sports in Oklahoma
1992 in sports in Oklahoma
Oklahoma State